FC Zbrojovka Brno B, commonly known as Zbrojovka Brno B or Zbrojovka Brno U-21, is the reserve team of Czech First League club FC Zbrojovka Brno and plays in the Divize D in the fourth tier of the Czech football league system.

Players

Reserve team squad
.

|
|
|
|
|
|
|
|
|
|

|
|
|
|
|
|
|
|
|

References

External links
Official website

FC Zbrojovka Brno
Reserve team football
Youth football in the Czech Republic